The Prix Wilder-Penfield is an award by the government of Quebec that is part of the Prix du Québec, which "goes to scientists whose research aims fall within the field of biomedicine. These fields include the medical sciences, the natural sciences, and engineering". It is named in honour of Wilder Penfield.

Winners
Source:

See also

 List of biochemistry awards
 List of medicine awards
 List of prizes named after people

References

Canadian science and technology awards
Prix du Québec
Awards established in 1993
Biochemistry awards
Medicine awards